Lugius was a co-leader of the Cimbri tribe during the Cimbrian War, in which the Cimbri won a spectacular victory against the Romans at the Battle of Arausio in 105 BC. He was later defeated and slain along with Boiorix at the Battle of Vercellae in 101 BC. The other Cimbrian chiefs Claodicus and Caesorix were captured.

References

101 BC deaths
2nd-century BC Germanic people
Cimbrian people
Germanic warriors
Military personnel killed in action
People of the Cimbrian War
Pre-Roman Iron Age
Year of birth unknown